E. C. Goodwin Technical High School, or Goodwin Tech, is a technical high school located in New Britain, Connecticut. It is in the Connecticut Technical High School System. It receives students from many nearby towns.

Technologies
In addition to a complete academic program leading to a high school diploma, students attending Goodwin Tech receive training in one of the following trades and technologies:

Automotive Technology
Carpentry
Culinary Arts
Electrical
Electronics (Now called Mechatronics) Technology
Hairdressing and Cosmetology
Heating, Ventilation and Air Conditioning (HVAC)
Information Systems Technology
Mechanical Design and Engineering Technology
Plumbing and Heating
Precision Machining Technology

References

External links
 Official website 

Public high schools in Connecticut